Luciobarbus microcephalus is a ray-finned fish species in the family Cyprinidae. It is here placed in Luciobarbus following the IUCN, but that genus is very closely related to the other typical barbels and perhaps better considered a mere subgenus of Barbus.

It is endemic to the Iberian Peninsula, where it occurs in the middle and lower Guadiana River's drainage basin in both Portugal and Spain. A presumably introduced population is found in a small stretch of the Tagus. Its natural habitats are deep and slow rivers and reservoirs.

Its numbers are declining across its rather small range, and it is classified as Vulnerable by the IUCN. By 2020 its stocks will probably number less than half of what they were at the turn of the millennium. The main cause of its decline is unsustainable use of water resources, such as water pollution, extraction for agriculture and damming. Certain planned damming projects – e.g. one near Alquedi – are likely to severely impact the species' stocks. Introduced exotic fishes pose an additional problem.

L. microcephalus is listed in Annex V of the European Union's Habitats Directive to allow its taking from the wild to be legally restricted, and – as Barbus capito, which actually refers to its Central Asian relative, the Bulatmai barbel – as Protected Species in Appendix III of the Convention on the Conservation of European Wildlife and Natural Habitats.

See also
 Water supply and sanitation in Spain#Links to water resources

References

 
  (2008): Natural hybridization of Barbus bocagei x Barbus comizo (Cyprinidae) in Tagus River basin, central Spain [English with French abstract]. Cybium 32(2): 99-102. PDF fulltext
  (2007): Evolutionary origin of Lake Tana's (Ethiopia) small Barbus species: indications of rapid ecological divergence and speciation. Anim. Biol. 57(1): 39–48.  (HTML abstract)

Luciobarbus
Cyprinid fish of Europe
Endemic fish of the Iberian Peninsula
Taxa named by Carlos Alberto da Silva Almaça
Fish described in 1966
Taxonomy articles created by Polbot